Vineland Dreams is an album by American guitarist Steve Laury released in 1996, and recorded for the CTI label. The New York Times called Vineland Dreams "some of the finest smooth jazz cuts you'll hear", and called Laury's solo work "a testament to his sheer craftsmanship"

Track listing
(all tracks written by Steve Laury and Ron Satterfield)
Gloria Ann (Steve Laury / Ron Satterfield) - 5:26
Vineland Dreams (Steve Laury / Ron Satterfield) - 5:30
Let's Stay Together (Wille Mitchell/Al Green/Al Jackson) - 5:01
When Dreams Come True (Steve Laury) - 6:24
The Moon Beneath The Clouds (Steve Laury) - 5:34
I'll Be There (Hal Davis / Berry Gordy / Willie Hutch) - 4:42
Cara Mia (Steve Laury) - 5:15
Lullaby For Laura (Steve Laury) - 5:32
59th Street (Steve Laury) - 5:38
Angel - (Wes Montgomery) - 4:26

Personnel
Steve Laury - guitar
Rob Whitlock - keyboards
James Raymond - keyboards
Kevin Hennessy - bass
Norm Stockton - bass
Duncan Moore - drums, percussion
Mitch Manker - trumpet
John Rekevics - saxophone
Ed Graves - vocals

References

External links
Vineland Dreams at CD Universe
Vineland Dreams at AllMusic
Steve Laury plays Angel at YouTube

1996 albums
CTI Records albums